BR-080 is a federal highway of Brazil.

References 

Federal highways in Brazil